"Need Your Love" is the lead single from the Australian indie rock band The Temper Trap from their second studio album The Temper Trap. The single was released on 23 March 2012 in Australia as a digital download, and officially to charts on 7 May.

Music video
A music video to accompany the release of "Need Your Love" was first released onto YouTube on 13 April 2012 at a total length of three minutes and forty-eight seconds. The video parodies the movie The Karate Kid, particularly the climatic final matchup at the end of the movie.

Track listing
Digital download
 "Need Your Love" – 3:38
 "Rabbit Hole" – 3:05

Chart performance

Release history

References

2012 singles
2011 songs
The Temper Trap songs